Satyagnana Sabha (Temple of Wisdom is a temple constructed (25.01.1872) by the saint Sri Raamalinga Swaamigal (Vallalaar) in the town of Vadalur in Cuddalore district,  Tamil Nadu, India. It is an octagonal structure; the sanctum sanctorum of this temple is concealed from the main hall by seven curtains which are parted only on the Thai Poosam day. All the four towers of the Chidambaram Nataraajar temple are visible from the sabha.

The Sathya gnana sabha consists of three sabhas:
 The Chirchabai (சிற்சபை) which represents moon or left eye of people,
 The Porchabai (பொற்சபை) or golden sabha which represents the sun or right eye of people and
 The third Gnana sabha (ஞான சபை) which represents the third eye or the wisdom of people.

The building was built in an octagonal shape which represents the 8 bones in the human skull. Only two Saints established Sangha (sabha) in Indian and World history. One is Gautama Buddha, another is Saint Vallalar. All Saivite madams are primarily for religious pupils, to which common people only go when a  need arises. But a Sabha is a place where common people can go, join, organize and they can interact with spiritual people. Vallalar clearly mentioned this in his poetry as given below:
"எச்சபை பொதுவென இயம்பினர் அறிஞர்கள்
அச்சபை யிடங்கொள்ளும் அருட்பெருஞ் ஜோதி"
meaning, "This sabha is a common place for every one, who follows San maargam (good way)".

Near the Sathya gnana sabha there is the Dharma saalai where free food is offered to thousands of people every day. The Dharma saalai  has a stove which was lighted by  Sri Raamalinga swaamigal (Vallalar),  which is still being used for cooking. Near the Dharma saalai, there is the jeeva samaadhi of Kalpattu ayyaa. He was the second san maargi attaining dheekshai from vallalar.

Notes

References

Hindu temples in Cuddalore district